Adam Hawley is a pop contemporary guitarist.

Biography
Hawley was born and raised in Portland, Oregon. At a young age he developed a keen interest in music, taking up piano lessons at eight and  guitar lessons a year later. He eventually attended the University of Southern California where he graduated with a PhD in Music.

Discography

Albums

Singles

References

Living people
American male guitarists
American jazz guitarists
Musicians from Portland, Oregon
Year of birth missing (living people)